Matthew Steer (born 24 April 1978) is an English actor and writer.

He made his stage debut in 1989 and is known for his roles as Ricky Ryan in Silent Witness, Matt Lindsay in EastEnders and Albert Pemberton in Partners in Crime.

References

External links

Living people
People from Hitchin
Actors from Hertfordshire
1978 births